Fritz Baffour (born 11 March 1952) is a Ghanaian journalist, politician and communications consultant. He was the Member of Parliament for Ablekuma South constituency in the Parliament of Ghana and the Minister for Information during the Mills Administration.

Early life and education
Baffour was born on 11 March 1952 in Korle Gonno in Accra, the capital of Ghana. His father was R. P. Baffour, an academician and one of the first Ghanaian mechanical engineers as well as the first Ghanaian Vice Chancellor of the Kwame Nkrumah University of Science and Technology. His mother was a midwife. His secondary education was at the Prempeh College and the Technology Secondary School, both in Kumasi in the Ashanti Region of Ghana. He obtained his GCE Ordinary Level certificate in 1968. His sixth form education was at the City of Bath College in Somerset in the United Kingdom between 1972 and 1974, completing with the GCE Advanced Level certificate. Baffour also attended the Bristol Polytechnic between 1974 and 1976. Fritz Baffour did a master's degree in Communication Studies from the Leicester University between 2007 and 2012.

Career
Baffour worked as a journalist. He was a producer with Ghana Television, the TV channel of the state owned Ghana Broadcasting Corporation as a producer and director. He has also worked with Liberian Television, Nigerian Television, Tyne Tees TV UK, Diverse Production in UK and Back to Back Productions USA. He was also a media consultant to the government of Jerry Rawlings.

Politics
Baffour was involved with the National Democratic Congress from its inception in 1991. He became a member of parliament in January 2009 after winning the Ablekuma South seat in the Ghanaian parliamentary election in 2008. He was appointed Minister for information by President John Atta Mills in 2012.

See also
List of Mills government ministers
National Democratic Congress
Ablekuma South constituency

References

External links and sources
Ghana government website
GhanaDistricts.com

Living people
1952 births
Ghanaian Roman Catholics
Information ministers of Ghana
National Democratic Congress (Ghana) politicians
Ghanaian MPs 2009–2013
Ghanaian MPs 2013–2017
Prempeh College alumni
Alumni of the University of Leicester